The golden-spotted tree monitor (Varanus boehmei), also known commonly as the golden speckled tree monitor, is a species of monitor lizard in the family Varanidae. The species is endemic to Waigeo Island in Indonesia.

Etymology
The specific name, boehmei, is in honor of German herpetologist Wolfgang Böhme.

Geographic range and habitat
V. boehmei is native to the forests of Waigeo, Indonesia.

Behavior
The golden-spotted tree monitor has a prehensile tail, and it spends most of its life in trees.

Description

Reproduction
V. boehmei is oviparous.

References

Further reading
Bucklitsch Y, Böhme W, Koch A (2016). "Scale Morphology and Micro-Structure of Monitor Lizards (Squamata: Varanidae: Varanus spp.) and their Allies: Implications for Systematics, Ecology, and Conservation". Zootaxa 4153: 001–192.
Jacobs HJ (2003). "A further new emerald tree monitor lizard of the Varanus prasinus species group from Waigeo, West Irian (Squamata: Sauria: Varanidae)". Salamandra 39 (2): 65–74. (Varanus boehmei, new species).
Ziegler T, Schmitz A, Koch A, Böhme W (2007). "A review of the subgenus Euprepiosaurus of Varanus (Squamata: Varanidae): morphological and molecular phylogeny, distribution and zoogeography, with an identification key for the members of the V. indicus and the V. prasinus species groups". Zootaxa 1472: 1–28.

Varanus
Lizards of Asia
Fauna of Southeast Asia
Reptiles of Indonesia
Reptiles described in 2003